Lauderdale County is a county located on the western edge of the U.S. state of Tennessee, with its border the Mississippi River. As of the 2020 census, the population was 25,143. Its county seat is Ripley. Since the antebellum years, it has been developed for cotton as a major commodity crop.

History
Lauderdale County was created in 1835 from parts of Tipton, Dyer and Haywood counties. It was named for Lieutenant Colonel James Lauderdale, who was killed at the Battle of New Orleans in the War of 1812. Planters developed large cotton plantations along the waterways, and used enslaved African Americans in gangs to work and process this commodity crop. After the American Civil War, many freedmen initially stayed in the area, working the land as sharecroppers or tenant farmers. Whites used violence to enforce white supremacy after the war, continuing after Reconstruction. In the period after Reconstruction and into the early 20th century, whites in Lauderdale County committed eight lynchings of blacks. This was the fifth-highest total of any county in the state, but three other counties also had eight lynchings each in this period.

Battle of Fort Pillow

In 1861, the Confederate States Army built extensive defensive fortifications in Lauderdale County along the Mississippi River and named the site for General Gideon J. Pillow. Because of its strategic location, the fort was taken over by the Union Army in 1864, which had occupied the state since 1862.

In 1864, Confederates attacked and overran the fort's Union defenders, who were about evenly split between white and black soldiers. They were reported to have refused to surrender, but historians have disputed this account. The Confederates gave the soldiers no quarter, and killed black soldiers in twice the proportion of white ones. After the Union Army established the United States Colored Troops (USCT), made up of numerous recruits who were escaped slaves, Southern military officials vowed to kill them rather than take them prisoner. People in the North considered this event to be a massacre, and blacks in the Union Army used the cry, "Remember Fort Pillow!" to rally during the remainder of the war.

Fort Pillow State Park has a museum to interpret the battle and also has reconstructed fortifications on the original site of the fort.

Geography
The county's western boundary is formed by the Mississippi River, its northern boundary with Dyer County is formed by the Forked Deer River, and its southern boundary with Haywood County is formed by the Hatchie River.

Lauderdale County is situated on the southeastern edge of the New Madrid Seismic Zone, an area with a high earthquake risk.

Adjacent counties
Dyer County (north)
Crockett County (east)
Haywood County (southeast)
Tipton County (south)
Mississippi County, Arkansas (west)

National protected areas
Chickasaw National Wildlife Refuge
Lower Hatchie National Wildlife Refuge (part)

State protected areas
Cold Creek Wildlife Management Area
Fort Pillow State Park
Alex Haley House and Museum (state historic site)
Sunk Lake State Natural Area
John Tully State Forest
John Tully Wildlife Management Area

Major roads
Future Interstate 69
U.S. Highway 51
Tennessee State Route 19 (Tina Turner Highway)
Tennessee State Route 87
Tennessee State Route 88
Tennessee State Route 180
Tennessee State Route 181
Tennessee State Route 371

Demographics

2020 census

As of the 2020 United States census, there were 25,143 people, 9,675 households, and 6,753 families residing in the county.

2000 census
As of the census of 2000, there were 27,101 people, 9,567 households, and 6,811 families residing in the county.  The population density was 58 people per square mile (22/km2).  There were 10,563 housing units at an average density of 22 per square mile (9/km2).  The racial makeup of the county was 63.82% White, 34.08% Black or African American, 0.62% Native American, 0.16% Asian, 0.02% Pacific Islander, 0.52% from other races, and 0.78% from two or more races.  1.16% of the population were Hispanic or Latino of any race.

There were 9,567 households, out of which 32.80% had children under the age of 18 living with them, 49.70% were married couples living together, 17.60% had a female householder with no husband present, and 28.80% were non-families. 25.60% of all households were made up of individuals, and 11.10% had someone living alone who was 65 years of age or older.  The average household size was 2.55 and the average family size was 3.06.

In the county, the population was spread out, with 24.80% under the age of 18, 10.30% from 18 to 24, 31.20% from 25 to 44, 21.70% from 45 to 64, and 12.10% who were 65 years of age or older.  The median age was 35 years. For every 100 females there were 108.10 males.  For every 100 females age 18 and over, there were 109.00 males.

The median income for a household in the county was $29,751, and the median income for a family was $36,841. Males had a median income of $28,325 versus $21,238 for females. The per capita income for the county was $13,682.  About 16.20% of families and 19.20% of the population were below the poverty line, including 24.70% of those under age 18 and 26.50% of those age 65 or over.

Culture

Sleepy John Estes
Sleepy John Estes was a U.S. blues guitarist, songwriter and vocalist, born in Ripley, Tennessee. He died on June 5, 1977, in his home of 17 years in Brownsville, Haywood County, Tennessee. Sleepy John is buried at Elam Baptist Church Cemetery in Durhamville, Lauderdale County.

Veterans' Museum in Halls

The Veterans' Museum on the grounds of the former Dyersburg Army Air Base in Halls is dedicated to the preservation and documentation of materials related to military activities from World War I to the present day wars and conflicts, as well as documenting the history of the air base itself.

Government and infrastructure

The Tennessee Department of Corrections operates the West Tennessee State Penitentiary in unincorporated Lauderdale County, near Henning. Previously the Cold Creek Correctional Facility was located in the area.

Communities

City
Ripley (county seat)

Town
Gates
Halls
Henning

Unincorporated communities

Arp
Cherry
Durhamville
Fulton
Glimp
Golddust
Orysa

Education
All parts of the county are in the Lauderdale County School District.

Notable natives
Sleepy John Estes, blues guitarist born in Ripley
Alex Haley - author of Roots
Jim Hickman - Professional Baseball All-Star
Miles O'Keeffe, television and film actor best known for starring in the 1981 film Tarzan, the Ape Man, and the Ator movies.

See also

National Register of Historic Places listings in Lauderdale County, Tennessee

References

External links

 The Lauderdale County Home Page
Lauderdale Chamber / Economic and Community Development
 Lauderdale County, TNGenWeb - free genealogy resources for the county

Lauderdale County Department of Education

 
1835 establishments in Tennessee
Populated places established in 1835
Tennessee counties on the Mississippi River
West Tennessee